Bahamas will compete at the 2022 World Athletics Championships in Eugene, United States, from 15 to 24 July 2022. Bahamas has entered 17 athletes.

Medalists

Entrants
 including alternates

Men

Track and road events

Field events

Combined events – Decathlon

Women

Track and road events

Mixed
Track and road events

References

World Championships in Athletics
2022
Nations at the 2022 World Athletics Championships